Singye Dzong is a town in Luentse District in eastern Bhutan.

References

External links
 Satellite map at Maplandia.com
 Singye Dzong: the Legendary Lion Fortress

Populated places in Bhutan